Dr. Ejaz Ali is an Indian politician who served as a Member of the Rajya Sabha from Bihar representing the Janata Dal (United) from 2008 to 2010. He is national convenor of All-India Backward Muslim Morcha, an organisation fighting for Scheduled Caste status for Dalit Muslims. Ali had founded the organisation 1994.  He is a doctor by training and has been practicing medicine in Patna since 1984.

References

Living people
Rajya Sabha members from Bihar
Year of birth missing (living people)